Cilaus is a monotypic moth genus of the family Crambidae described by Joseph de Joannis in 1932. Its one species, Cilaus longinasus, described by the same author in the same year, is only known from the medium altitudes of Réunion in the Indian Ocean.

The name of the genus Cilaus is probably a misspelling of Cilaos, the valley of origin of the holotype of this species.

References

 de Joannis, J. 1932. Lépidoptères Hétérocères des Mascareignes. :427–456; pl. 23

Musotiminae
Moths of Réunion
Endemic fauna of Réunion
Monotypic moth genera
Taxa named by Joseph de Joannis
Crambidae genera

nl:Cilaus longinasus